The Hull City Psychos are a football hooligan firm  linked to the English Championship club, Hull City.

Background
The firm dates back to the 1960s and peaked during the 1990s.

The City Psychos evolved from the original Hull skinhead gangs and the Kempton Fusiliers who were named after the east side railway stand at Boothferry Park. They were well known as tough representatives of Kingston upon Hull, a big tough working class port city.

It was not unusual for the City Psychos to number over half Hull City’s away support during the years in the lower leagues at the end of the 1970s and start of the 1980s. They were famous for travelling to away games on Hull Corporation double-decker buses. From 1979 the more traditional scarfer element of support became known as the normals whilst these equally loyal supporters evolved in to City’s casual mob and were some of the earliest casual boys seen in Yorkshire outside the North West and won respect for their fierce rivalry with Sheffield United, Middlesbrough and York City.

Today
The mob is now known as The Minority and the youth firm are known as the Young City Casuals or 'YCC' along with the even younger group known as the 'Under 5's'.

References

Further reading
Tordoff, Shaun (2002). City Psychos: From the Monte Carlo Mob to the Silver Cod Squad - Four Decades of Terrace Terror, Milo Books, 

British football hooligan firms
Hull City A.F.C.
Gangs in England